Drosha is a Class 2 ribonuclease III enzyme that in humans is encoded by the DROSHA (formerly RNASEN) gene. It is the primary nuclease that executes the initiation step of miRNA processing in the nucleus. It works closely with DGCR8 and in correlation with Dicer. It has been found significant in clinical knowledge for cancer prognosis and HIV-1 replication.

History 
Human Drosha was cloned in 2000 when it was identified as a nuclear dsRNA ribonuclease involved in the processing of ribosomal RNA precursors. The other two human enzymes that participate in the processing and activity of miRNA are the Dicer and Argonaute proteins. Recently, proteins like Drosha have been found significant in cancer prognosis and HIV-1 replication.

Function 

Members of the ribonuclease III superfamily of double-stranded (ds) RNA-specific endoribonucleases participate in diverse RNA maturation and decay pathways in eukaryotic and prokaryotic cells. The RNase III Drosha is the core nuclease that executes the initiation step of microRNA (miRNA) processing in the nucleus.

The microRNAs thus generated are short RNA molecules that regulate a wide variety of other genes by interacting with the RNA-induced silencing complex (RISC) to induce cleavage of complementary messenger RNA (mRNA) as part of the RNA interference pathway. MicroRNA molecules are synthesized as long RNA primary transcripts known as a pri-miRNAs, which are cleaved by Drosha to produce a characteristic stem-loop structure of about 70 base pairs long, known as a pre-miRNA. Pre-miRNAs, when associated with EXP5, are stabilized due to removal of the 5' cap and 3' poly(A) tail. Drosha exists as part of a protein complex called the Microprocessor complex, which also contains the double-stranded RNA binding protein DGCR8 (called Pasha in D. melanogaster and C. elegans). DGCR8 is essential for Drosha activity and is capable of binding single-stranded fragments of the pri-miRNA that are required for proper processing. The Drosha complex also contains several auxiliary factors such as EWSR1, FUS, hnRNPs, p68, and p72.

Both Drosha and DGCR8 are localized to the cell nucleus, where processing of pri-miRNA to pre-miRNA occurs. These two proteins homeostatically control miRNA biogenesis by an auto-feedback loop. A 2nt 3' overhang is generated by Drosha in the nucleus recognized by Dicer in the cytoplasm, which couples the upstream and downstream processing events. Pre-miRNA is then further processed by the RNase Dicer into mature miRNAs in the cell cytoplasm. There also exists an isoform of Drosha that does not contain a nuclear localization signal, which results in the generation of c-Drosha. This variant has been shown to localize to the cell cytoplasm rather than the nucleus, but the effects on pri-miRNA processing are yet unclear.

Both Drosha and Dicer also participate in the DNA damage response.

Certain miRNAs have been found to deviate from conventional biogenesis pathways and do not necessarily require Drosha or Dicer, which is because they do not require the processing of pri-miRNA to pre-miRNA. Drosha-independent miRNAs derive from mirtrons, which are genes that encode for miRNAs in their introns and make use of splicing to bypass Drosha cleavage. Simtrons are mirtron-like, splicing-independent, and do require Drosha mediated cleavage, although they do not require most proteins in the canonical pathway such as DGCR8 or Dicer.

Clinical significance 

Drosha and other miRNA processing enzymes may be important in cancer prognosis. Both Drosha and Dicer can function as master regulators of miRNA processing and have been observed to be down-regulated in some types of breast cancer. The alternative splicing patterns of Drosha in The Cancer Genome Atlas have also indicated that c-drosha appears to be enriched in various types of breast cancer, colon cancer, and esophageal cancer. However, the exact nature of the association between microRNA processing and tumorigenesis is unclear, but its function can be effectively examined by siRNA knockdown based on an independent validation.

Drosha and other miRNA processing enzymes may also be important in HIV-1 replication. miRNAs contribute to the innate antiviral defense. This can be shown by the knockdown of two important miRNA processing proteins, Drosha and Dicer, which leads to a significant enhancement of viral replication in PBMCs from HIV-1-infected patients. Thus, Drosha, in conjunction with Dicer, seem to have a role in controlling HIV-1 replication.

References

Further reading

External links 
 

Ribonucleases
MicroRNA
RNA interference
RNA-binding proteins